Taxodiomyia taxodii, the cypress leaf gall midge, is a species of gall midges, insects in the family Cecidomyiidae.

References

Further reading

External links

 Diptera.info

Cecidomyiinae
Insects described in 1911
Taxa named by Ephraim Porter Felt